The 2011 Swindon Borough Council election took place on 5 May 2011 to elect members of Swindon Unitary Council in Wiltshire, England. One third of the council was up for election and the Conservative Party stayed in overall control of the council.

After the election, the composition of the council was
Conservative 38
Labour 17
Liberal Democrat 4

Background
Before the election the Conservatives controlled the council with 40 seats, compared to 15 for Labour and 4 for the Liberal Democrats. 20 of the 59 seats were being contested, with the winners only serving for one year as the 2012 election would see every seat being contested after boundary changes. Since the 2010 election Labour had gained Moredon in a by-election and had the independent, former Conservative, councillor Steve Wakefield of Toothill and Westlea ward join the party, both in November 2010.

During the campaign both the national Labour leader Ed Miliband and the Labour Shadow Works and Pensions Secretary Liam Byrne visited Swindon to support the local party.

Election result
The results saw the Conservatives stay in control of the council with 38 seats, but lose 2 seats to Labour, who moved to 17 seats. Labour gained the seats of St Philip and Walcot from the Conservatives, while coming close in Eastcott against the Liberal Democrats and in Covingham and Nythe, Dorcan and Freshbrook and Grange Park, which were held by the Conservatives. The Labour victory in Walcot defeated the Conservative cabinet member Peter Mallinson, with the winning candidate Ellen Osa becoming the first female black councillor in Swindon. Overall turnout at the election was 38.26%, ranging from a high of 46.08% in Highworth to a low of 29.62% in Parks.

The outgoing leader of the Labour group, Derique Montaut, said the results meant that "For Labour it builds us up to a situation where we are moving up to 2012 and taking control of the council". However the Conservative leader of the council, Ron Bluh, said that while "It obviously wasn't one of the better nights", the seats lost had been the "two most marginal seats" and "so there's no great surprise".

Following the election Jim Grant was elected as the new leader of the Labour group on the council, defeating Mark Dempsey and Bob Wright.

Ward results

References

2011 English local elections
2011
2010s in Wiltshire